Michael John Clark (February 12, 1922 – January 25, 1996) was an American professional baseball player. A right-handed pitcher, Clark was 30 years old when he broke into the Major Leagues on July 27, 1952, with the St. Louis Cardinals. Although he played 17 years of professional baseball, he appeared in only two partial seasons in the Majors, working in 35 games played for the – Cardinals.

Clark was a native of Camden, New Jersey. His career began in the Cardinal farm system in 1940 and continued through 1959, interrupted by three years of service in the United States Army during World War II.

In the Majors, he appeared in 29 of his 35 games in relief, and allowed 78 hits and 35 bases on balls (with 27 strikeouts) in 61 innings pitched. He was undefeated in three decisions and recorded one save.  As a minor leaguer, he compiled a 163–146 win-loss record in 556 games, including an 18-win 1949 season for the Columbus Cardinals of the Class A Sally League.

References

External links

1922 births
1996 deaths
Atlanta Crackers players
Austin Senators players
Baseball players from Camden, New Jersey
Beaumont Exporters players
Columbus Cardinals players
Dallas Rangers players
Hamilton Red Wings (baseball) players
Houston Buffaloes players
Houston Buffs players
Major League Baseball pitchers
Mobile Shippers players
Rochester Red Wings players
St. Louis Cardinals players
Seattle Rainiers players
United States Army personnel of World War II